Call Me is a 1988 American erotic thriller film about a woman who strikes up a relationship with a stranger over the phone, and in the process becomes entangled in a murder. The film was directed by Sollace Mitchell, and stars Patricia Charbonneau, Stephen McHattie, and Boyd Gaines.

Plot
Anna, a young and energetic journalist, receives an obscene call from an unknown caller whom she mistakes for her boyfriend. As a result of this mistake she agrees to meet with the caller at a local bar. There she witnesses a murder in the women's bathroom. She finds herself drawn into a mystery involving both the killer and the mysterious caller who she shares increasingly personal conversations with.

Cast

Reception
The film was reviewed by the television show At the Movies, on the May 28th, 1988. Roger Ebert called the film a "directorial mess", citing laborious scenes which serve only to set up plot points, some of which are never followed up on. Gene Siskel felt the premise had potential, but it was ruined by the lead character's relentless stupidity, and that the film did not take the sexual elements far enough. The critics gave the film two thumbs down.

External links
 
 Call Me at AllMovie

References

1988 films
1988 thriller films
American crime thriller films
American erotic thriller films
1980s crime thriller films
1980s erotic thriller films
Films scored by David Michael Frank
Films about telephony
Vestron Pictures films
1980s English-language films
1980s American films